Tototepec is a town located in the state of Guerrero in Mexico. It is located in the municipality of Tlapa de Comonfort and has a population of 2,573 as of 2012. In Mixteco, the indigenous language of the region, the town is known as Yozononi. The town's elevation is 1,670 meters above sea level.

References

Populated places in Guerrero